The Zeekr 001 is the first electric vehicle produced by Geely under the Zeekr brand and technical cousin of Lynk & Co. The vehicle was released in China in October 2021 and is scheduled for release in Europe in 2023.

Overview

The Zeekr 001 was originally previewed by the Lynk & Co Zero Concept revealed in 2020. The production 001 was presented on 16 April 2021. Its shooting brake design is similar to the  Porsche Panamera Sport Turismo and it features a similar front end to that of the Lynk & Co 05, also produced by Geely.

The 001 is based on the Sustainable Experience Architecture platform specific to the electric models of the Geely group.

Performance
A special model limited to 1,000 units will be sold in 2023 with the CATL Qilin battery containing 140 kWh to allow up to 1,000 km of range.

Sales
2,012 units were sold in more than 150 cities across China during the first full month of production in November 2021, with 199 additional units during October 2021. The company stated its plan to ramp up production during 2022 with a target of 70,000 vehicles, and continuing to prioritize local market customers ahead of a global roll-out in 2023.

References

Zeekr 001
Production electric cars
Hatchbacks
Station wagons
Cars introduced in 2021
Rear-wheel-drive vehicles
All-wheel-drive vehicles